TV2Me is a device that allows TV viewers to watch their home's cable or satellite television programs on their own computers, mobile phones, television sets and projector screens anywhere in the world. "This technology gives users the ability to shift space, and to watch all the cable or satellite TV channels of any place they choose - live, in full motion, with unparalleled television-quality - on any Internet connected device."

History
TV2Me was invented by Ken Schaffer, who began working on it in 2001, when he was working overseas. His goal was to watch his favorite American shows through any kind of device from wherever he was. With a team of Turkish and Russian programmers he developed circuitry that allows the MPEG-4 encoder to operate more efficiently and to generate a better picture.
Schaffer, who was known for having previously invented the Schaffer–Vega diversity system, the first practical wireless guitar and microphone system for major rock bands, and for developing satellite tracking systems that allowed U.S. agencies and universities to monitor internal television of the then Soviet Union, launched TV2Me on December, 2003. TV2Me introduced the concept of placeshifting and started an entire industry.

Operation
To set up TV2Me, the cable or satellite box and a broadband internet connection are plugged in the device. "The server requires an Internet connection with an upstream speed of 512 kb/s or higher."
On the receiving end (for example the computer), any browser can be used to view in real-time or with a 6-second delay. The delayed mode uses the extra time to produce a slightly better picture. No additional software needs to be installed. "The "target" (receiving location) can be anywhere on earth − anywhere there's wired or wireless broadband. The viewer can use virtually any PC running Windows, Mac, Linux - even Solaris."

Copyrights
No copyright infringement has been set for this placeshifting device but this technology is problematic to many copyright holders because it sidesteps what is known in legalese as proximity control, which restricts the distribution of content to specific regions and times. "It's a standard contractual stipulation for the MPAA, whose member studios license distribution rights to movies for distinct territories; the NFL, which considers geographic limits the linchpin of lucrative television deals, including its Sunday Ticket pact with DirecTV; and local television stations, which pay millions of dollars for exclusive territorial rights to all kinds of programming."
On this issue, Ken Schaffer's position has been: "The TV2Me user paid for the rights to watch these programs. What separates him from other cable subscribers is that he has a long extension cord."

Competition

Since TV2Me was launched other devices that claim similar characteristics have been introduced to the market. Slingbox, the most popular placeshifting device has a price of US$250 and attracts customers, but its poor quality image has been highly criticized. A constant battle between TV2Me and Slingbox is fought over different web forums. TV2Me, aiming at the high-end videophile audience has always had as its design objective the highest-quality video possible; Slingbox, aimed at the broad consumer market, the most economical. Location FreeTV made by Sony offers cheaper units and a smaller home base station, but the image quality is also deficient.

See also
Spaceshifting / placeshifting
Copyright
Private copying
Schaffer-Vega Diversity System

References

External links
TV2Me

Television technology
Television placeshifting technology